Marcel Fässler (born 21 February 1959) is a Swiss bobsledder who competed in the late 1980s. Fässler won a gold medal in the four-man event with teammates Ekkehard Fasser, Kurt Meier and Werner Stocker at the 1988 Winter Olympics in Calgary.

References
Bobsleigh four-man Olympic medalists for 1924, 1932-56, and since 1964
DatabaseOlympics.com profile

1959 births
Bobsledders at the 1988 Winter Olympics
Living people
Olympic gold medalists for Switzerland
Olympic bobsledders of Switzerland
Swiss male bobsledders
Olympic medalists in bobsleigh
Medalists at the 1988 Winter Olympics
20th-century Swiss people